Vitali Vladimirovich Tregubov (born January 28, 1974) is a retired Kazakh professional ice hockey defenceman.

Tregubov played in the Russian Superleague for Torpedo Ust-Kamenogorsk, Severstal Cherepovets, Torpedo Nizhny Novgorod and Amur Khabarovsk.

He was also member of the Kazakhstan men's national ice hockey team and played in the 1998 Winter Olympics and the 1998 IIHF World Championship.

Career statistics

Regular season and playoffs

International

References

External links

1974 births
Living people
Amur Khabarovsk players
Barys Nur-Sultan players
Ice hockey players at the 1998 Winter Olympics
Soviet ice hockey defencemen
Kazakhstani ice hockey defencemen
Kazzinc-Torpedo players
Olympic ice hockey players of Kazakhstan
Severstal Cherepovets players
Sportspeople from Oskemen
Torpedo Nizhny Novgorod players
Asian Games gold medalists for Kazakhstan
Asian Games silver medalists for Kazakhstan
Medalists at the 1999 Asian Winter Games
Medalists at the 2003 Asian Winter Games
Asian Games medalists in ice hockey
Ice hockey players at the 1999 Asian Winter Games
Ice hockey players at the 2003 Asian Winter Games